Esnagami Lake is a lake in Thunder Bay District, Ontario, Canada, north of Nakina, Ontario, with numerous islands, rivers and bays containing brook trout, northern pike, perch, walleye and freshwater whitefish.

References

Lakes of Thunder Bay District